Visitor Studies is a peer-reviewed academic journal covering visitor research, including reflections on the area, research methodologies, and theoretical aspects. The journal covers subjects relating to museums and learning in the context of historic sites, nature centers, parks, visitor centers, and zoos. It is interdisciplinary in nature, including humanities, business management, and social sciences. The journal was established in 1998 and is published by Taylor & Francis (Routledge). The editors are Karen Knutson and Kevin Crowley, both of the University of Pittsburgh Center for Learning in Out-of-School Environments.

The journal is under the auspices of the Visitor Studies Association.

Abstracting and indexing
The journal is abstracted and indexed in:

References

External links
 

Publications established in 1998
Routledge academic journals
English-language journals
Biannual journals
Tourism journals